Asociación Deportiva Atlético Villa Gesell, mostly known as Atlético Villa Gesell, is an Argentine sports club from Villa Gesell, Buenos Aires Province. The stadium was named in honour to Carlos Idaho Gesell, the founder of the city. The team has taken part of Liga Madariaguense tournaments since 1976. Mostly known for its football team, Atlético Villa Gesell also hosts the practise of athletics, field hockey, volleyball and figure skating.

The club was founded on December 7, 1974, being Eduardo Castillo its first president. In 1989 Atlético won the Liga Madariaguense tournament, which allowed it to play at 1990 Torneo Regional. In 2011, Atlético qualified to play at Torneo Argentino C after beating El León 2–1 in the city of General Madariaga.

Titles
Liga Madariaguense de Fútbol: 5
 1989, 1991, 1993, 1995, 2002

References

External links
Official website 
Liga Madariaguense de Fútbol 

Villa Gesell
Association football clubs established in 1974
1974 establishments in Argentina